"Don't Tell Me That It's Over" is the first single released from Scottish singer-songwriter Amy Macdonald's second studio album, A Curious Thing, released on 26 February 2010 in 
Germany and on 1 March 2010 in the United Kingdom.

The song showcased a new musical style for Amy Macdonald, with a much heavier rock and less folk rock influenced sound than previous singles. It features a distorted electric guitar sound.

Website Digital Spy commented on the song saying: "'Don't Tell Me That It's Over' is a glossier, rockier effort laced with strings that wouldn't shame a stadium-filler from Take That or Coldplay. As ever though, it's Macdonald's knack for a proper pop chorus and that irresistible Gaelic lilt that catch your ear, and her pointed lyrics that hold it. "Tell me what I'm meant to see, why are you preaching at me?" she asks popstars with A Worthy Cause fetish. Oh Bono, are you listening?"

Background
Macdonald began writing songs for her second album in spring 2009, in a brief break from her touring commitments. For the first time she began poring through her old notebooks, looking at song ideas, unlike her debut which consists mainly of songs that she wrote straight away. Many of the tracks were inspired by real-life personalities or events from her daily life. The tracks were recorded at Weller's BlackBarn Studios in Surrey.

Track listing

German CD single

European CD single° / iTunes - EP

UK CD single

Music video
The music video shows Macdonald singing and playing the guitar in a kind of band room. The video also features scenes from nature and city life.

Chart performance

Weekly charts

Year-end charts

Personnel
 Mixed By - Bob Clearmountain
 Producer, Arranged By - Pete Wilkinson
 Written-By, Vocals, Guitar - Amy Macdonald

Credits

Backing Vocals - Sarah Erasmus
Bass Guitar - Ben Sargeant
Cello - Ann Lines
Drums - Adam Falkner
Electric Guitar - Jolyon Dixon
Engineer [Balance] - Jo Miflin
Engineer [Mastering] - Dick Beetham
Engineer [Pro-tools] - Mo Hausler
Executive Producer - Paul Adam
Guitar - Mark Kulke
Keyboards - Shannon Harris
Mixed By - Danton Supple
Photography - Nicky Emmerson
Producer - Paul Long
Producer [Additional], Engineer - Joe Fields
Producer, Arranged By, Arranged By [Strings], Arranged By [Keyboards], Arranged By [Piano] - Pete Wilkinson
Viola - Peter Lale (tracks: 1), Susan Dench
Violin - Chris Tumbling, Jonathan Hill, Laura Melhuish, Leo Payne
Vocals, Acoustic Guitar - Amy Macdonald
Written-By - Amy Macdonald, Paul Weller

References 

2010 singles
2009 songs
Amy Macdonald songs
Songs written by Amy Macdonald